Ælita is the seventh studio album by the Swedish band Mando Diao. The album introduces a new style for the band, using the Soviet analog synthesizer Aelita, after which it is named. The album features synthesizers and electronic drums.

Track listing
The listed tracks are:

Charts

Weekly charts

Year-end charts

References

External links
 

2014 albums
Mando Diao albums